The Detroit Grand Prix (currently branded as the Chevrolet Detroit Grand Prix presented by Lear Corporation for sponsorship reasons)  is an IndyCar Series race weekend held on a temporary circuit in Detroit, Michigan. The race has been held from 1989 to 2001, 2007 to 2008, and since 2012. Since 2012, the event has been scheduled for the weekend immediately following the Indianapolis 500.

The origins of the event date back to the Formula One Detroit Grand Prix on the Detroit street circuit. The CART series began headlining the event in 1989, and in 1992, the race moved from downtown Detroit to Belle Isle, a park situated on an island in the Detroit River, which is the longest serving venue of the race. The IndyCar Series took over the race beginning in 2007. The race has been supported by Indy Lights and Formula Atlantic and top-level sports car series such as the Trans-Am Series and the ALMS. For 2023 the race will return to the downtown streets around the Renaissance Center using a circuit partially based on the original Detroit street circuit used by Formula One and CART. 

Open wheel racing in Detroit dates back to the 1920s–1950s, when AAA held the Detroit 100 at the Michigan State Fairgrounds Speedway. AAA also held one five-mile (8 km), non-championship race at Grosse Pointe in 1905.

The Raceway on Belle Isle is classified as an FIA Grade Two circuit. The original Detroit Street Circuit was considered at the time an FIA Grade One circuit, while the upcoming downtown circuit is expected to also be an FIA Grade Two Circuit.

Formula One

The race dates back to  when it was a Formula One World Championship event held on the Detroit street circuit encompassing the Renaissance Center. The rough, demanding course included a railroad track crossing and mimicked Monaco, with a tunnel on the main straight. While officially the Detroit Grand Prix, it was also referred to as the United States Grand Prix East because there were multiple Grand Prix races in the U.S. at the time. By the time of the 1988 race, the FIA, the governing body of Formula One, had declared the street circuit's temporary pits and garages were not up to the required standard. The race was already the least popular Grand Prix on the calendar and after a very difficult 1988 Grand Prix the drivers became outspoken with their dislike of the event.

For , race organizers planned to move the race to a new temporary circuit on Belle Isle, a city park in the Detroit River. Along with the criticism of the downtown circuit, local developers were also planning to begin construction along portions of that course, making it difficult to set up in the coming years. The relocation plan to Belle Isle was immediately met with stiff local opposition, both public and political. Even though the circuit would be temporary, permanent garages and pit facilities would have needed to be constructed, at significant expense, and at the odds of conservation groups. Also against their favor was a budding interest to relocate the United States Grand Prix to Laguna Seca. That track was courting Formula One, having recently completed capital improvements, and having just hosted a highly successful United States motorcycle Grand Prix. Furthermore, an upstart group in Phoenix was also aggressively vying for the race.

In October 1988, the plan to move to Belle Isle was scrapped. Formula One left Detroit permanently, and a short time later, it was officially announced that the U.S. Grand Prix was moving to Phoenix.

It was in Detroit in  that Italian driver Michele Alboreto drove his Tyrrell 011 to victory in the US Grand Prix East in what would prove to be the 155th and last ever F1 win by the Cosworth DFV V8 engine.

CART

Renaissance Center: 1989 to 1991

For 1989, the race in Detroit was replaced by a CART series event. Instead of moving to Belle Isle, CART utilized a slightly modified version of the existing downtown Renaissance Center street circuit. The chicane on the main straight was eliminated - something the F1 drivers had been calling for since the first race in 1982. The CART race was held on this  layout for three years. As had been the case in the event's Formula One days, competitors and fans continued to pan the course, criticizing it for its bumpiness, poor visibility and overall poor layout.

The 1991 event was perhaps the last straw in what was an embarrassment for the organizers. In addition to a disintegrating track made worse by suffocating heat and humidity, it saw Mario Andretti crash his Lola head-on into a tow truck. The safety crew was attempting to remove Dennis Vitolo's stalled car from a blind corner at St. Antoine and East Jefferson Streets. Seconds later Michael Andretti came onto the scene, and crashed into Vitolo's car attempting to avoid his father's wrecked car. Ultimately, promoters considered the downtown circuit a money-loser, and claimed it was suffering from poor television ratings with its Father's Day date (up against the U.S. Open).

Belle Isle: 1992 to 1997
Beginning in 1992, the race was moved to a new temporary course set up on Belle Isle. The move revived a conceptual plan for the Formula One event from four years earlier. One major difference that made Belle Isle viable for CART - and acceptable to locals - was that permanent Formula One style garages and pits were not required by the sanctioning body. The race was also moved up a week, and for 1992, was the first race after the Indianapolis 500 (displacing the traditional Milwaukee). The first layout measured . Almost immediately, the new course was criticized by drivers for being narrow, slow, and lacking passing zones. It was complemented, however, for its smoothness - a sharp contrast to the rough, manhole-dotted downtown circuit. Fans' opinions were mixed, as sightlines were improved over the downtown circuit, but access to the island was difficult, and the racing was not much better.

Course modification: 1998 to 2000
In 1998, the course layout was modified to eliminate the slow "Picnic Way" segment and series of corners. Instead, the course continued straight along Central Avenue to create a long, fairly-wide straightaway leading into a competitive passing zone. The track then measured . The revised layout was praised by competitors as being an improvement over the original (1992–1997) course. However, pavement transitions from asphalt to concrete were being blamed for an increase in incidents due to slickness.

The 2000 event saw young Brazilian Hélio Castroneves score his first Champ Car victory for Marlboro Team Penske. After his victory lap, he stopped on the front stretch and climbed the catch fencing in an apparent effort to share his joy with the spectators. Helio became known as "Spider-Man" because of this celebration, which has been repeated in his later victories.

Support races for the Detroit Grand Prix included the Motor City 100 for the SCCA Trans-Am Series, and the Neon Challenge celebrity race. Scenes from the film Driven were filmed during the race weekend in 2000.

The event, along with the Michigan 500, provided two CART races in southern Michigan annually.

Demise: 2001
Even though the track was a temporary street course, it became known as The Raceway on Belle Isle. As the years went by, the track was increasingly criticized for its narrowness, poor access, and its overall uncompetitive nature. The once smooth surface was aging in the harsh Detroit winters, and along with it came bumps, cracks and potholes. The circuit gained a reputation of being the "worst" and "least popular" venue on the entire schedule. In 1997, it was noted that race winner Greg Moore started seventh and did not pass a single car competitively out on the track for position all day. Participants also disliked the facility because of its lack of paved areas for support activities. Paddock areas were often muddy and unable to accommodate the teams.

After the 2001 race, CART's contract with Belle Isle expired. Attendance had been noticeably slipping. Negotiations to continue the event went over the summer, but eventually stalled. Organizers briefly entertained an idea to return to the old downtown circuit, but those plans were quickly scuttled. The series chose to drop the race from the schedule and the event went on hiatus.

IndyCar Series

2007 to 2008
In 2006, Roger Penske spearheaded talks to revive the race for 2007 as part of the ALMS and IndyCar Series schedules. Penske had recently experienced tremendous success as head of the Super Bowl XL Detroit Metro Host Committee. On September 29, 2006, it was announced that the Detroit Indy Grand Prix would return as the tenth race of the ALMS's 12-race season and penultimate race of the IndyCar Series' seventeen-race schedule.

To improve access to the track, a park-and-ride system, similar to what was used at Super Bowl XL, was implemented. Further paddock and track work was completed before the race. The 2007 event attracted a strong crowd, and was considered a success. It was held again in 2008. During this period, the event utilized the original (1992–1997) course layout, with some minor improvements. Some of the barriers were moved back, particularly inside the apexes of some of the turns, to effectively widen some curves and improve sight lines. Some barriers, including the metal guardrail on the pit straight, had been entirely removed.

On December 18, 2008, the scheduled race for 2009 was canceled. The ongoing automotive economic crisis, and its impact on the Detroit-area was the primary reason. Roger Penske did not rule out a return in the future.

Doubleheader era
For the 2012 season, the race on Belle Isle was revived for second time. The event was situated on the weekend immediately after the Indianapolis 500. Starting in 2013, the race was hosted as a unique "doubleheader" weekend. The race weekend would consist of two separate, points-paying races, one each on Saturday and Sunday. The races were treated as separate events, with separate qualifying, full championship points, and the results of the first had no bearing on the lineup for the second (as had been the case with some previous "twin" race formats). Beginning in 2013, the race also returned to the more popular and more competitive "long" course (1998–2001 layout).

On April 6, 2020, IndyCar announced the cancellation of the 2020 edition due to the COVID-19 pandemic. As part of race cancellations and postponements due to the pandemic, Detroit was scheduled to be the opening event. Organizers stated that Michigan's stay-at-home order (which has since been extended through April 30) would hinder the necessary preparations to hold the race, and that the race cannot be reasonably rescheduled due to other events having been booked on Belle Isle already. The race returned in its traditional double header format for 2021. 
On September 19, 2021, IndyCar announced that the Detroit Grand Prix would be altered from a two race weekend to a single race weekend as part of their 2022 schedule.

Downtown revival: 2023
Mere weeks after the 2022 IndyCar schedule was announced Penske Entertainment Group revealed that moving the Detroit Grand Prix to a single race weekend was done as part of a proposal discussed with the city of Detroit to return the race back to the Renaissance Center utilizing a new downtown circuit beginning in 2023. Penske Entertainment wanted the race to return to the Renaissance Center based on fan criticisms of the raceway at Belle Isle, namely that it was difficult access on race weekend, that there was not any room to expand seating on the island, and that residents of Detroit did not appreciate the section of the park that the circuit is built on being shut down for the length of time it took to construct and tear down the circuit. On November 3, 2021, the City Council of Detroit unanimously approved Penske Entertainment's plan and announced an initial three-year contract to return the Detroit Grand Prix back to the downtown streets for a single race weekend beginning in 2023.

The new downtown circuit is based on lessons learned from the Nashville Street Circuit. It is designed to be less disruptive to city traffic while also being more accessible to spectators and having more points of visibility to the racing than the old Detroit Street Circuit. The new circuit will feature ten corners and is 1.7 miles in length compared to the 2.5 mile circuit used by Formula One and CART and the 2.35 mile Raceway On Belle Isle. It will travel from the start/finish line on Atwater Street and head onto Schwarzer Street, Franklin Street, and Rivard Street in the first series of corners. From Rivard Street drivers will make a sharp left turn onto the circuit's most prominent feature, a 0.7 mile straightaway down East Jefferson Avenue. This straightaway will be the longest straightaway on an IndyCar street circuit, eclipsing the dual straights on the Korean War Veterans Memorial Bridge in Nashville. The circuit will then turn onto Bates Street before heading back onto Atwater Street. The only part of the old Detroit Street Circuit used on the new circuit will be the old circuit's sixteenth and seventeenth corners that were then known as The Ford Corner. On the new circuit this section will be the eighth and ninth corners. Neither of the tunnels or the side streets used on the old Detroit Street Circuit will be used on the new circuit to minimize impact on local businesses and city traffic around downtown Detroit. To increase spectator viewership IndyCar and Penske Entertainment will offer free viewership at multiple points along the circuit. The Detroit City Council stated the entire circuit will be fully resurfaced before the race. Construction and tear down of the circuit will take place 8:00PM and 5:00AM over the course of twenty days respectively, minimizing disruptions to city traffic around the Renaissance Center.

Past winners

Grosse Pointe (dirt oval)

Michigan State Fairgrounds (dirt oval)

Renaissance Center

Belle Isle

1996, 2007, 2008, & 2015 II: Races shortened due to 2 hour time limit.
2012: Race shortened due to darkness after 2 hour suspension for track repairs.
2015 I: Race shortened due to lightning policy.
2019 I: Race shortened to 75 minute time limit due to lightning policy delaying the start.

Detroit Sports Car Classic

American Le Mans Series

Rolex Sports Car Series

IMSA WeatherTech SportsCar Championship

2021: The GT Le Mans class (consisting of only the 2 Corvette Racing entries) ran a non-points paying exhibition during this race. No. 4 of Tommy Milner and Nick Tandy beat No. 3 of Jordan Taylor and Antonio Garcia by 0.226s

Support race winners

Atlantics / Indy Lights

Trans-Am Motor City 100

 Winner Wally Dallenbach Jr. was disqualified due to car being underweight.

Stadium Super Trucks

 Race suspended after three laps following Matt Mingay's wreck on lap three that resulted in injury.

Lap records

The unofficial track record is 1:13.056, set by Juan Pablo Montoya in a Lola B2K/00, during qualifying for the 2000 Tenneco Automotive Grand Prix of Detroit. The official race lap records at the Belle Isle Park Circuit are listed as:

Race summaries

CART PPG Indy Car World Series (Renaissance Center)

1989: Emerson Fittipaldi touched wheels with Mario Andretti on lap 2, puncturing a tire and sending him to the back of the field. But Fittipaldi charged from 27th position to second place in the closing laps. Polesitter Michael Andretti led 52 of the first 54 laps, but a radio wire became tangled in the throttle pedal. On lap 55, the throttle pedal stuck sending Andretti into a barrier. Scott Pruett was now leading the race by 17 seconds, but was forced to back off to conserve fuel. Fittipaldi blew by Pruett with four laps to go to take the victory.
1990: Michael Andretti started from the pole position and led wire-to-wire, winning the race in dominating fashion. Danny Sullivan was running close behind in second place on lap 46 when during his final pit stop, an impact wrench failed. The wheel was not properly fastened, and on the out-lap, the drive pegs on the wheel broke, putting him out of the race. Bobby Rahal nursing brakes, finished second, over one minute and 48 seconds behind Andretti. Rahal held off Emerson Fittipaldi who finished close behind in third.
1991: Emerson Fittipaldi, expecting the birth of his fifth child, was leading Bobby Rahal in the closing laps when gearbox problems arose. With seven laps to go, Fittipaldi's car kept jumping out of gear. He was mostly forced to hold the gearshift with one hand, and steer with only hand, on the rough, bumpy, demanding circuit. Rahal charged hard, but Fittipaldi held him off for the victory by 0.29 seconds. The race is best-remembered for a bizarre incident involving Mario and Michael Andretti. On lap 48, Dennis Vitolo stalled in turn four with a seized transmission. Safety crew tended to Vitolo's car, hooking up a tow rope. Mario Andretti came around what was a blind corner, locked up his brakes, and rammed hard into the back of the safety truck. The nose of the car was wedged underneath the truck's bumper, and the track was nearly blocked. A couple cars (including Fittipaldi) skirted by the scene, but seconds later, Michael Andretti slid and crashed into the back of Vitolo's car. The track was now completely blocked, and the red flag was put out to clean up the scene. This would be the final race held at the Renaissance Center circuit until 2023.

CART PPG Indy Car World Series (Belle Isle)

1992: For 1992, the race was moved to a new circuit on Belle Isle. Michael Andretti led the early laps, with Paul Tracy (subbing for Rick Mears) and Bobby Rahal close behind. Tracy made a daring pass on lap 38 for the lead going into turn one, nearly touching wheels with Andretti. On lap 58, Tracy was leading Andretti, with Bobby Rahal in third. All three cars were nose-to-tail. Andretti attempted to pass Tracy for the lead, but this time, the two cars touched. Both Tracy and Andretti slid high and scraped the concrete wall, allowing Bobby Rahal to slip by both to take the lead. Tracy later dropped out with gearbox failure, but Andretti stayed with Rahal, despite nursing an ill-handing machine. On the second-to-last lap, Andretti spun out and dropped to fourth while Rahal cruised to victory.
1993: A controversial race filled with penalties from start to finish. At the green flag, Emerson Fittipaldi jumped the start from the outside of the front row, beating pole-sitter Nigel Mansell to the line by almost two car lengths. Instead of waving off the start, official assessed Fittipaldi a stop-and-go penalty. Later in the race Paul Tracy was penalized for breaking the 80 mph pit road speed limit (clocked at 93 mph), and Nigel Mansell was accused of blatant blocking. Danny Sullivan took the lead on lap 48. In the closing laps, Galles Racing teammates Sullivan and Al Unser Jr. were running 1st-2nd. On lap 69, Unser challenged Sullivan for the lead, but was forced down to the inside, and knocked down three cones. Officials charged Unser with going off-course, and assessed him a stop-and-go penalty. On a restart with four laps to go, rookie Robby Gordon driving for Foyt, tried to pass Sullivan for the lead, but was squeezed down and had to back off. Moments later, Gordon spun out with a cut tire. Danny Sullivan went on to win the race, his final win in Indy car competition.
1994: Penske teammates Al Unser Jr., Paul Tracy, and Emerson Fittipaldi were running 1st-2nd-3rd on a restart on lap 55. Tracy was on the back bumper of Unser, as Unser was dicing through backmarker traffic. Going into turn 8, Tracy ran into the back of Unser's car, sending him sliding head-on into a tire barrier. Tracy went on to win the race, with Fittipaldi second. Unser rejoined the field and finished 10th.
1995: Robby Gordon started from the pole position and led 43 of the 77 laps en route to victory. Gordon led the first eight laps, but slipped down in the standings after suffering tire wear. Gordon switched to the optional harder tire compound, and charged back to the front. He took the lead with 35 laps to go, and held off Jimmy Vasser for the win.
1996: Heavy rain fell in the morning, and continued to fall during the first 25 laps. Christian Fittipaldi led 64 of the first 65 laps, but a late caution came out when Bobby Rahal slid into a tire barrier. On a restart on lap 66, Michael Andretti battled Fittipaldi for the lead coming out of turn four. Fittipaldi locked up the brakes, and slid high in turn five, which allowed Andretti to drive by and take the lead. The race was shortened from 77 to 72 laps due to a two-hour time limit. Andretti became the first and only driver to win at both the downtown Renaissance Center circuit and the Belle Isle circuit.
1997: At the white flag, Maurício Gugelmin led Mark Blundell and Greg Moore, with all three cars running nose-to-tail. PacWest Racing teammates Gugelmin and Blundell were running very low on fuel, attempting to stretch their tanks to the finish. Gugelmin ran out of fuel on the Strand Drive backstretch, and seconds later Blundell ran out of fuel as he approached the final turn. Greg Moore slipped by to take the lead and scored the victory.

CART FedEx Championship series (Belle Isle)

1998: A slightly reconfigured layout was introduced for 1998. Several tight and slow corners were replaced with a longer straightaway, and potentially better passing zones. Alex Zanardi battled Greg Moore during the early stages of the race. Moore pitted first on lap 24, while Zanardi stayed out two additional laps. Zanardi's light fuel load, and lightning-fast in-lap, put him back out on the track ahead of Moore. Zanardi led the final 50 laps to victory, and celebrated by performing donuts on his victory lap.
1999: The race was moved to August to avoid a conflict with the NASCAR Michigan 400. In a race that was described as "ugly," several crashes were capped off by a bizarre finish under yellow. On the first lap, Max Papis touched wheels with Patrick Carpentier, and crashed into a tire barrier. On lap 25, Maurício Gugelmin tangled with Cristiano da Matta, and flip upside-down, landing on top of Carpentier's car. Twenty laps later, de Matta suffered a hard crash in turn two, collecting Al Unser Jr. Under caution late in the race, a fuel leak from the pace car caused a confusing delay, requiring officials to bring out a back-up pace car. With some drivers anticipating a restart, Hélio Castroneves ran into the back of Juan Pablo Montoya. The race hit the two-hour time limit, and finished under yellow with Team Kool Green drivers Dario Franchitti first, and Paul Tracy second.
2000: Polesitter Juan Pablo Montoya led 59 of the first 60 laps, but dropped out with a broken driveshaft. Hélio Castroneves took the lead on lap 62, and led the final 24 laps en route to his first career CART series victory. On his victory lap, Castroneves stopped his car on the frontstretch, jumped from cockpit, and climbed up the catchfence to celebrate his victory.
2001: Hélio Castroneves started from the pole position and led wire-to-wire to win the Detroit Grand Prix in back-to-back years. Castroneves survived a minor scare when telemetry indicated a pressure leak in his left front tire. After the victory, Castroneves once again jumped from his car and climbed the catchfence in his signature "Spiderman" celebration. This would be the final CART series race at Detroit.

IRL / IndyCar Series (Belle Isle)
2007: After a six-year absence, open wheel racing returned to Detroit. The Indy cars utilized the original "short" course layout, previously raced on from 1992 to 1997. After the final series of pit stops, a four-car battle at the front ensued. Tony Kanaan was leading, and second place Buddy Rice ran out of fuel. Third place Scott Dixon took evasive action to get by Rice, which crashed out both cars. The pileup collected Dario Franchitti as well. Danica Patrick slipped by the crash and took a career-best second place, while Kanaan went on to win.
2008: Originally scheduled for 90 laps, the race was shortened to 87 laps due to two-hour limit. Late in the race, Justin Wilson was challenging Hélio Castroneves for the lead. Officials ruled that Castroneves intentionally blocked, resulting in a penalty which allowed Wilson to take the lead. Despite a late push by Castroneves, Wilson won the race, his first-career Indy car victory. Wilson's win was the 107th and final Championship Car victory for Newman/Haas Racing, and occurred just weeks before the death of co-owner Paul Newman.
2012: After a three-year hiatus, the Detroit Grand Prix returned to the IndyCar calendar. For 2012, the race was moved to the weekend immediately following the Indianapolis 500. The race was shortened from 90 laps to 60 laps due to a disintegrating track. James Hinchcliffe's car dislodged a chunk of the pavement, and crashed into a tire barrier. Officials discovered other parts of the track that were damaged, and a red flag was put out to make repairs. Rain also began to fall. Scott Dixon won the race from the pole position.
2013 (Race 1): For 2013, the "long" course layout was revived, and the race was now part of a doubleheader weekend. During the first race on Saturday, Mike Conway started second and led 47 laps en route to victory. Conway passed Ryan Hunter-Reay for the lead on lap 44. He then built a 20-second lead before the final round of pit stops. Conway's margin of victory was 12.9707 seconds over Hunter-Reay. Dario Franchitti, who won the pole position, was issued a grid penalty for an unapproved engine change, and started 11th. He improved to sixth place at the finish, while Scott Dixon who had to pit for wing damage suffered due to contact on lap 1, charged from 24th place to 4th.
2013 (Race 2): On Sunday, Mike Conway started on the pole position, attempting to sweep the weekend. However, multiple cautions and different race strategies jumbled the field, and he wound up third. On lap 24, the field was coming off a restart when Tristan Vautier touched wheels with Takuma Sato, sending Sato into the tire barrier in turn 3. On lap 28, the ensuing restart saw Conway leading Scott Dixon into turn one. Seconds later, Sebastien Bourdais tagged the back of Will Power, triggering a ten-car pileup. In the second half, the race came down to Conway, Simon Pagenaud, and James Jakes. On the final sequence of pit stops, Pagenaud emerged as the leader, with Jakes second, and Conway closing in third. Pagenaud drove to victory, by 5.6274 seconds. Jakes held off Conway for second place by 0.4342 seconds.
2014 (Race 1): On Saturday, Will Power held off Graham Rahal during the final ten laps and scored the first Indy car win at Detroit for Chevrolet & GM since 1993. Just across the river from GM's headquarters at the Renaissance Center, Helio Castroneves started on the pole and led 30 laps. Power took the lead from Ryan Briscoe on a restart on lap 60. Rahal ran in second, less than a second behind Power. Rahal was able to keep up with Power over the final ten laps, but was unable to muster a pass for the lead. Tony Kanaan finished third, his 66th-career podium finish.
2014 (Race 2): On Sunday, Helio Castroneves drove to victory, completing a Penske and Chevrolet sweep of the weekend. Castroneves was leading Will Power by over 9 seconds with twenty laps to go, but a late-race caution bunched up the field. With six laps to go, Castroneves led, but another caution came out setting up one last restart. With three laps to go, Castroneves got the jump and won by 1.6836 seconds over Will Power. After the victory, Castroneves climbed the catchfence, repeating his signature celebration from the 2001 race.
2015: (Race 1): On Saturday, heavy rain and lightning in the area caused the race to be shortened from 70 to 47 laps. Carlos Munoz won, his first IndyCar victory.
2015: (Race 2): On Sunday, rain had washed out qualifying for the second race, and the field lined up by points. Several yellows slowed the race in the second half. Sébastien Bourdais was the winner.
2017 (Race 1): On Saturday, Graham Rahal led 55 of 70 laps to win, nearly 25 years to the day that his father Bobby won the race. Rahal held off second place Scott Dixon, who was driving despite an injured ankle from a major crash the week earlier at the Indianapolis 500.
2017 (Race 2): Graham Rahal swept the weekend, winning Sunday's second race, leading 41 of 70 laps. With five laps to go, the first caution of the day came out when James Hinchcliffe stalled on the course, and Spencer Pigot's car was smoking. Officials red flagged the race on lap 67 in order to allow for a green flag finish, and cleaned up the incidents. Rahal held off Josef Newgarden in a two-lap dash to finish.
2021 (Race 1): The new Roger Penske led IndyCar returned to Detroit after the 2020 double header was canceled due to the COVID-19 pandemic. The controversial race saw Scott Dixon take a large lead by starting the race on harder primary tires as opposed to the softer alternate tires used by the rest of the field. Dixon's strategy was upended when Arrow McLaren SP driver Felix Rosenqvist crashed at near full speed into a tire barrier, throwing a red flag that halted the race for over an hour. When the race restarted many drivers, including Dixon, broke off on the formation lap to pit for fresh tires, handing Will Power the lead as Power had pitted for his own set of tires right before the red flag. Marcus Ericsson also cycled to the front with Power based on similar strategy and challenged Power for the lead before a crash by Romain Grosjean caused another red flag to be thrown. When the formation lap on the track began Power's crew was unable to get his car to restart due to an overheated ECU, handing the lead to Ericsson who hung on for five more laps to win his first IndyCar race. Rinus VeeKay and Pato O'Ward rounded out the podium.
2021 (Race 2): Josef Newgarden won his first of what would be three consecutive pole positions heading into the summer break and led most of the race despite several restarts by using a strategy that put him on the harder primary tires throughout the opening two thirds of the race. Although Newgarden and Penske executed a three stop strategy perfectly it left the two time series champion to face the unforgiving Belle Isle circuit with used softer compound alternate tires that degraded rapidly in the closing laps. Following a restart where he was unable to manage the tire wear Newgarden was overtaken by Pato O'Ward, who had overtaken five other drivers in a two lap span to challenge Newgarden. The second year McLaren driver then built a gap of over five seconds to the rest of the field to take his first win on a street course. Newgarden held off late charges by Alex Palou and Colton Herta to stay in second place while Palou rounded out the podium.
2022: The final Detroit Grand Prix held on Belle Isle was moved from a double header to a single 70 lap race. Josef Newgarden qualified on pole but it would be his teammate Will Power who would dominate the race, charging through the field from 16th to take the lead early in the race and hanging onto it via virtue of a two stop strategy. Power's only threat on the day was Alexander Rossi, who picked up his first podium of 2022. Scott Dixon finished in third place.

IRL / IndyCar Series (Renaissance Center)
2023: For 2023 the Detroit Grand Prix returned to the Renaissance Center using a brand new condensed circuit around The Renaissance Center.

References

External links
http://www.detroitgp.com
http://www.champcarstats.com

 
1982 establishments in Michigan
Belle Isle Park (Michigan)
Recurring sporting events established in 1982
IndyCar Series races